Eochelodes is an extinct genus of polyplacophoran molluscs.

References 

Ordovician animals
Prehistoric chiton genera